Richard Allison (1757 – March 22, 1816) was Physician General of the U.S. Army, the position that later became Surgeon General, from 1792 to 1796. He was the first physician to set up a permanent practice in Cincinnati, Ohio.

Early life 
Allison was born near Goshen, New York in 1757.

Career
During the American Revolutionary War, he served as a surgeon's mate in the Pennsylvania Line of the Continental Army. He was the senior American military physician in the Northwest Indian War, and became the surgeon general of General Anthony Wayne's Legion when those troops were organized and defeated the Indians at the Battle of Fallen Timbers. On the re-organization of the army in 1789, he was appointed surgeon of a regiment of infantry, and became the ranking medical officer of the U.S. Army up to the time of his resignation.

After living for a few years on his farm on the east fork of the Little Miami River, he returned to the city in 1805, and continued to practice medicine until his death. Daniel Drake called him the "father of our local profession," and wrote of him that "though not profound in science, he was sagacious, unassuming, amiable and kind."

Death and legacy 
Allison died in Cincinnati after a short illness. He was buried in the Wesley Chapel Cemetery on Fifth Street. His body was later moved and now is buried in the Wesleyan Cemetery in Cincinnati.

References

 Mary C. Gillett. "Allison, Richard"; http://www.anb.org/articles/03/03-00004.html; American National Biography Online February 2000. Access Date: Tue Dec 25 13:05:29 EST 2007

External links
Grave of Richard Allison

1757 births
1816 deaths
American people of the Northwest Indian War
18th-century American physicians
Burials at Wesleyan Cemetery, Cincinnati
Continental Army officers from Pennsylvania
Physicians from Cincinnati
Physicians in the American Revolution
Surgeons General of the United States Army
People from Goshen, New York
People of the Province of New York